This is a list of films which have placed number one at the weekend box office in Japan during 2010.

Highest-grossing films

See also
List of Japanese films of 2010

References

 Note: Click on the relevant weekend to view specifics.

2010
Japan
2010 in Japanese cinema